{{Infobox Organization
| name         = EAI - European Alliance for Innovation
| image        = Eai logo with margins.png
| image_size   = 320px
| Non-profit_type   = Professional Community
| alt          = European Alliance for Innovation logo
| caption      = The pictogram represents a Möbius strip in order to display the connection of research and innovation.

| founded      = 2010
| focus        = Internet of Things, eHealth, Smart city, Applications for future internet 
| method       = Community, Conferences, Summits, Publications
| headquarters = Ghent, Belgium
| | leader_title = President
| leader_name  = Imrich Chlamtac
| website      = 
| members      = ICST,<ref>'</ref>  Fraunhofer FOKUS, Create-Net, Agentúra na Podporu Výskumu a Vývoja, STU, EUREC, Microsoft Israel R&D Center, IBM Israel
}}European Alliance for Innovation (EAI)''' is an international professional community and a nonprofit organization. The goal of EAI is to empower the global ICT research and innovation community, and to promote cooperation between European and International ICT communities.

The headquarters of EAI is located in Ghent, Belgium. Other offices are located in Bratislava, Slovak Republic, Shanghai, China, and Boston, United States. The office in Bratislava was created in cooperation with the Slovak University of Technology in Bratislava by signing a Memorandum of Understanding.

The organisation was founded by professor Imrich Chlamtac in 2010 and currently EAI has over 150.000 subscribers globally.

The company organizes events and conferences and provides support for the members, trying to improve the rate at which innovations reach the market.

Publication activities
EAI publishes scientific magazines and journals through its own community-driven publication platform called European Union Digital Library (EUDL). For online publications EAI uses its e-Scripts system, while EUDL houses a database of peer reviewed scientific publications.

Event activities
EAI organizes over 70 conferences and summits every year. These include:
 MOBIQUITOUS - 12th EAI International Conference on Mobile and Ubiquitous Systems: Computing, Networking and Services
 BROADNETS - 9th EAI International Conference on Broadband Communications, Networks, and Systems
 WISATS - 7th EAI International Conference on Wireless and Satellite Systems
 INTETAIN - 7th International Conference on Intelligent Technologies for Interactive Entertainment
 MOBIMEDIA - 8th International Conference on Mobile Multimedia Communications
 CROWNCOM - 10th International Conference on Cognitive Radio Oriented Wireless Networks
 INISCom - 1st International Conference on Industrial Networks and Intelligent Systems
 ICSON - First International Conference on Self-Organizing Networks
 Science and Solutions for a Sustainable Environment Conference 2014
 VALUETOOLS - 8th International Conference on Performance Evaluation Methodologies and Tools
 BICT - 8th International Conference on Bio-inspired Information and Communications Technologies
 5GU - 1st International Conference on 5G for Ubiquitous Connectivity
 GAMENETS - 5th International Conference on Game Theory for Networks
 IoT360 Hackathon
 IoT360 Summer School - International IoT360 Summer School on the Internet of Things

Collaborations

The European Alliance for Innovation has set up strong collaboration and a strategic partnership with the International Federation of Inventors' Associations (IFIA).

References

Professional associations based in Belgium
Non-profit organisations based in Belgium
Organizations established in 2010
International professional associations based in Europe